Jim Bratchford (2 February 1929 – 5 October 1997) was an Australian cricketer. He played in 55 first-class matches for Queensland between 1952 and 1960. He died during a flight from the United States to Australia.

See also
 List of Queensland first-class cricketers

References

External links
 

1929 births
1997 deaths
Australian cricketers
Queensland cricketers
People from Redland City
Cricketers from Queensland